Groveriella is a genus of wood midges, insects in the family Cecidomyiidae. The two described species are known only from Europe. The genus was established by Boris Mamaev in 1978.

Species
Groveriella baltica Spungis & Jaschhof, 2000
Groveriella carpathica Mamaev, 1978

References

Cecidomyiidae genera

Taxa named by Boris Mamaev
Insects described in 1978
Diptera of Europe